Luis Felipe, also known as "King Blood", is a Cuban-American former gang leader and is the founder of the New York chapter of the Latin Kings (ALKN) street gang.

Born in Havana, Cuba, Felipe came to the United States in the Mariel Boatlift in 1980. Six years later, in 1986, after fleeing Chicago, he founded the New York chapter of the Latin Kings.

In 1995, he was convicted of ordering multiple murders from prison by writing to members of the Latin Kings on the outside. Judge John S. Martin Jr. sentenced him to life imprisonment plus 45 years. Furthermore, the judge added extraordinary conditions, surprising even prosecutors. Judge Martin said Felipe must serve the sentence in solitary confinement. He forbade him to write or be visited by anyone except his lawyer and close relatives, of whom Felipe has none. Finally, the judge said that he himself, rather than the Federal Bureau of Prisons, would control the case. However, the appellate court recognized that federal statutes generally allow only the attorney general, through the Bureau of Prisons (BOP) to determine the conditions of confinement imposed on federal prisoners, but that other statutes, allow district courts to set special conditions of confinement on defendants convicted of racketeering.

Felipe is currently incarcerated at ADX Florence.

References 

1961 births
Living people
Cuban gangsters
Hispanic and Latino American gangsters
Latin Kings (gang)
Gang members
Gangsters from New York City
People from Havana
Cuban emigrants to the United States
American people convicted of murder
Inmates of ADX Florence
People convicted of murder by the United States federal government
American prisoners sentenced to life imprisonment
Prisoners sentenced to life imprisonment by the United States federal government